Norway competed at the 2011 World Championships in Athletics from August 27 to September 4 in Daegu, South Korea.

Team selection

A team of 13 athletes was
announced to represent the country
in the event.  The team will be led by Olympic gold medalist and defending
world champion, javelin thrower Andreas Thorkildsen.  The final team on the entry list comprises the names of 16 athletes.

The following athletes appeared on the preliminary Entry List, but not on the Official Start List of the specific event, resulting in a total number of 13 competitors:

Medalists
The following competitors from Norway won medals at the Championships

Results

Men

Women

Heptathlon

References

External links
Official local organising committee website
Official IAAF competition website

Nations at the 2011 World Championships in Athletics
World Championships in Athletics
Norway at the World Championships in Athletics